HMS Minotaur was a 74-gun third rate ship of the line of the Royal Navy, launched on 15 April 1816 at Chatham Dockyard.

She was never commissioned for sea service; on completion of construction the new vessel was immediately placed in reserve at Sheerness Dockyard until 1842 when she was fitted as a receiving ship for naval conscripts. By 1859 she had become a guardship in Sheerness harbour, and in 1861 was converted into a floating lazarette for passengers from merchant vessels who were suspected by the Customs Service of bringing in disease. Five years later she was sailed to Gravesend to serve as a hospital for cholera patients.

In July 1866 she was renamed Hermes, but was broken up at Sheerness Dockyard in 1869.

Notes

References

Ships of the line of the Royal Navy
Ganges-class ships of the line
1816 ships